General elections were held in Montserrat on 8 May 1958. The result was a victory for the Montserrat Labour Party, which won four of the five seats in the Legislative Council.

Campaign
A total of eleven candidates contested the elections, with the MLP nominating five, the Montserrat Democratic Party two and the remaining four running as independents.

Results

References

Elections in Montserrat
Montserrat
1958 in Montserrat
Election and referendum articles with incomplete results
May 1958 events in North America